Franciszek Salezy Jezierski (1740–1791) was a Polish writer, social and political activist of the Enlightenment period. A Catholic priest, he was involved with the creation of the Commission of National Education. Member of the Hugo Kołłątaj's Forge. Librarian of the Jagiellonian University. Supporter of the radical reforms, he attacked the privileges of the nobility (even through he was a petty noble himself) and supporter the causes of burghers and peasants.

1740 births
1791 deaths
Academic staff of Jagiellonian University
Polish activists
18th-century Polish–Lithuanian Roman Catholic priests
Polish political writers